Ravensburg is a Landkreis (district) in the southeast of Baden-Württemberg, Germany. Neighboring districts are (from southwest clockwise) Bodensee, Sigmaringen and Biberach, the Bavarian urban district Memmingen and the districts Unterallgäu, Oberallgäu and Lindau.

History
The district dates back to the Oberamt Ravensburg, which was created in 1810 when the previously free imperial city Ravensburg and the surrounding area became part of Württemberg. In 1938 the Oberamt was converted into a district and most of the Oberamt Waldsee was merged into the new district. In 1973 the district Wangen was merged into the district, together with a few municipalities from the district Saulgau, Überlingen and Biberach.
The district is also home to the toymaker Ravensburger.

Geography
The landscape of the district consists of the Oberschwäbischen Hügelland and Westallgäuer Hügelland hils.

Coat of arms
The coat of arms show a Lion, the symbol of the Welfen family. This family had their center in Ravensburg, before the area went to the Hohenstaufen family.

Cities and municipalities

Cities
Aulendorf
Bad Waldsee
Bad Wurzach
Isny im Allgäu
Leutkirch im Allgäu
Ravensburg
Wangen im Allgäu
Weingarten (Württemberg)

Administrative districts
Altshausen
Bad Waldsee
Gullen
Leutkirch
Mittleres Schussental
Vogt
Wangen
Wilhelmsdorf
Fronreute-Wolpertswende

Municipalities

References

External links

Official website (German)

 
Tübingen (region)
Districts of Baden-Württemberg